Aimée Castle is a Canadian actress known for her role as Lori Baxter on the TV series Big Wolf on Campus, Robyn Hood on Back to Sherwood, Satan's School for Girls, as well as numerous voice acting work such as in Hitman: Absolution, Grand Theft Auto V, Final Fantasy Type-0 HD and Lego Star Wars: The Force Awakens.

Early life
Castle is from Montreal, Quebec, Canada. She is a Dawson College graduate and studied journalism at Ryerson University.

Career
Castle began acting at the age of five as a birthday party child in the Warner Bros. Pictures film Of Unknown Origin starring Peter Weller.

She made appearances in television and movies such as Are You Afraid of the Dark?, the lead role of Robyn Hood in Back to Sherwood, Teen Sorcery, Laserhawk, Satan's School for Girls, Student Bodies, Mr. Headmistress and An American Affair as well as the voice of Helena in the English version of the children's anime television series Bumpety Boo.

She played Lori Baxter in Big Wolf on Campus.

Personal life
Aimée is the older sister of actress Maggie Castle, and has a daughter named Emma. She is an avid fan of the Montreal Canadiens.

Filmography
 Of Unknown Origin (1983) – Birthday Party Child
 Bumpety Boo (1985) – Helena (voice)
 Bouli (1989) – Additional Voices
 Mindfield (1989) – Little Girl
 Gold and Paper (1990) – Maureen Thompson
 Scanners III: The Takeover (1992) – Young Helena
 Love and Human Remains (1993) – Bernie's Drug Dealer
 Papa Beaver's Storytime (1993) – Additional Voices
 Are You Afraid of the Dark? (1995) – Greta
 An American Affair (1997) – Prostitute
 Laserhawk (1997) – Tracy Altergot
 Mr. Headmistress (1998) – Wendy
 When He Didn't Come Home (1998) – Becky
 Back to Sherwood (1998) – Robyn Hood
 Student Bodies (1999) – Girl
 The Secret Path (1999) – Lydia
 Teen Sorcery (1999) – Franny
 Satan's School for Girls (2000) – Courtney
 Big Wolf on Campus (2000–2002) – Lori Baxter
 Dice (2001) – Shelby Scott
 Mona the Vampire (2001) – Additional Voices
 Ice Age: Continental Drift (2012) – Additional Voices
 Hitman: Absolution (2012) – Additional Voices 
 Grand Theft Auto V (2013) – Local Population
 Final Fantasy Type-0 HD (2015) – Qun'mi Tru'e
 Lego Jurassic World (2015)
 Star Ocean: Integrity and Faithlessness (2016) – Fiore Brunelli
 Lego Star Wars: The Force Awakens (2016) – Stormtrooper
 Judgment (2019) – Saori Shirosaki
 The Loud House (2020) – Ms. Borutski
 American Dad (20??)

References

External links

Living people
Canadian child actresses
Canadian film actresses
Canadian television actresses
Canadian video game actresses
Canadian voice actresses
20th-century Canadian actresses
21st-century Canadian actresses
Year of birth missing (living people)